The Sindh Regiment (previously Sind Regiment) is an infantry regiment of the Pakistan Army established on 1 July 1980. The regiment takes its name from Sindh province in southern Pakistan. Prior to its formation there had been no regiment in the Pakistan Army specifically intended to recruit primarily from the Sindhi population. The regimental centre is located in Hyderabad, Sindh, Pakistan.

History 
Since independence in 1947, the Pakistan Army had been dominated by Punjabis, with as much as 77% of army personnel. A specific regiment was created to address concerns of underrepresentation of Sindhis. This was done by the transfer of eleven battalions from the Punjab Regiment and ten battalions from the Baloch Regiment. An additional seven battalions were raised in the period from 1988 to 1999 while another Baluch battalion was transferred in 1988. Further raisings between 2001 and 2019 brought total strength of the regiment to 33 battalions.

Uniform 
The regimental badge depicts crossed Sindhi axes surmounted by the star and crescent appearing above a title scroll in Urdu. All ranks wear a cherry pink beret with a red plume hackle.

Commanders 
Previous colonel-commandants of the regiment have included Lieutenant General Salim Haider, who has served as the commander of I (Strike) Corps, Mangla, and as the Master-General of Ordnance (MGO).

Battle honours 
The following battle honours are a representation of honours awarded to the battalions which form the regiment.
 Kargil War: 24th Battalion, Sindh Regiment participated in the War and Sepoy Fazl Aman was taken POW in the war and later repatriated.

Operational awards to individual members of the regiment include:
 1 Nishan-e-Haider (posthumously to Karnal Sher Khan for actions in the Kargil War of 1999).
 6 Sitara-e-Jurat
 12 Tamgha-i-Jurat (including four for actions in the Kargil War)

Non-operational awards include:
 6 Sitara-e-Basalat
 28 Tamgha-e-Basalat

Units 

Raised pre-Independence

 1st Battalion - Old 13 Baluch Regiment
 2nd Battalion - Old 17 Baluch Regiment
 3rd Battalion (Athra) - Old 18 Baluch Regiment

Raised in 1971 (Transferred in 1980)

 4th Battalion (Sarmast) - Old 44 Punjab Regiment
 5th Battalion - Old 45 Punjab Regiment
 6th Battalion (Qalandars)  - Old 46 Punjab Regiment
 7th Battalion (Jafakash)
 8th Battalion (Al Shawaz) - Transferred from Punjab Regiment
 9th Battalion (Saifullah)  - Transferred from Punjab Regiment
 10th Battalion - Old 46 Baluch Regiment
 11th Battalion (Tabbar) - Old 48 Baluch Regiment 
 12th Battalion - Old 49 Baluch Regiment
 13th Battalion - Transferred from Punjab Regiment 
 14th Battalion (Rawan Dawan) - Transferred from Punjab Regiment
 15th Battalion (Faateh) - Old 51 Punjab Regiment
 16th Battalion - Old 51 Baluch Regiment
 17th Battalion - Old 52 Punjab Regiment

 18th Battalion (Yakjan) - Old 53 Punjab Regiment
 19th Battalion (Sarbuland) - Old 52 Baluch Regiment 
 20th Battalion (Toofani) - Old 53 Baluch Regiment (Raised by Lt Col Mirza Aslam Beg in 1971.
 21st Battalion - 

Raised Post Amalgamation

 22nd Battalion (Daler)
 23rd Battalion (Sholazan) - Transferred from Baluch Regiment in 1988 (Old 61 Baluch Regiment)
 24th Battalion 
 25th Battalion (al-Kaseeb)
 26th Battalion (Janbaz)
 27th Battalion (Sher Haidri) - Parent battalion of Captain Karnal Sher, NH)
 28th Battalion (Ghaurians)  - Raised 1999.
 29th Battalion (Jeedar)
 30th Battalion
 31st Battalion
 32nd Battalion
 33rd Battalion
 34th Battalion

Affiliated units
 5 Light Commando Battalion (Sindh)
 40th Horse (Sind) armoured regiment

Alliances 
 1st Battalion with  - The Rifles

Notable personnel 
 Muhammad Qamar Abbas Rizvi, former officer, current member of Sindh Provincial Assembly.

References

External links 
 

Infantry regiments of Pakistan
Military units and formations established in 1980
Military in Sindh